The Women's snowboard big air competition at the FIS Freestyle Ski and Snowboarding World Championships 2019 was scheduled to be held on February 5 and 6, 2019. Due to bad weather conditions, the competition was cancelled.

Qualification

References

Women's snowboard big air